Ksaverove Ukraine, is the site of an ancient mega-settlement belonging to the Cucuteni–Trypillia culture dating to 3600-3200 BC. The settlement was for the time very large, covering an area of 100 hectares. This proto-city is just one of 2,440 Cucuteni-Trypillia settlements discovered so far in Moldova and Ukraine. 194 (8%) of these settlements had an area of more than 10 hectares between 5000-2700 BC and more than 29 settlements had an area in the range of 100 to 450 hectares.

See also
 Cucuteni–Trypillia culture
 Danubian culture

References

Cucuteni–Trypillia culture